Amsonia tomentosa is a species of flowering plant native to the southwestern United States (S California, S Nevada, Utah, Arizona, New Mexico, W Texas) and northern Mexico (Chihuahua). Its common names include woolly bluestar and gray amsonia.

Amsonia tomentosa is a short, woody plant with many erect stems rarely reaching half a meter in height. The plant has two forms, a green glabrous (hairless) form, and a gray woolly form. The leaves are oval but pointed, and about 3 centimeters long. The flowers are white with a green or blue tint. They are tubular at the base and have flat faces with five petals. The flowers often come clumped in a cyme inflorescence. The fruits are podlike follicles that may separate into sections, each bearing a seed.

Varieties
 Amsonia tomentosa var. stenophylla Kearney & Peebles – Arizona, New Mexico, Utah, Texas, Chihuahua
 Amsonia tomentosa var. tomentosa – S California, S Nevada, NW Arizona

Uses
Among the Zuni people, a compound poultice of the root of the tomentosa variety is applied with much ceremony to rattlesnake bite.

References

External links
Jepson Manual Treatment
USDA Plants Profile
Photo gallery

tomentosa
Plants used in traditional Native American medicine
Flora of the Southwestern United States
Flora of Chihuahua (state)
Plants described in 1845